Taiwan TG Butterfly Garden, established in 2000,	is the first formal transgender support group in Taiwan. Many members are transsexual; others identify as crossdressers, and others might be described as questioning or transgressive.

The organization served as flag guards at 2005 Taiwan Pride, and demanded amendments for gender equality in employment law, along with the Awakening Foundation, Gender/Sexuality Rights Association Taiwan and Taiwan Tongzhi Hotline Association.

The name 'butterfly' was inspired by a mixed gender butterfly.

In 2017 the organization entered hibernation,
but the Haori Transgender Hotline they had established back in 2008
continued to operate.

See also

LGBT rights in Taiwan
List of LGBT rights organisations

References

External links
 
 Josephine Ho, The Embodiment of Identity. Briefly mentioned establishment of the group.
 Sex.ncu.edu.tw
 Taipei Times

In Chinese
 何春蕤，認同的「體」現：打造跨性別（PDF格式）。訪談多位TG蝶園成員，並於30頁提到團體由來。
 夏德珍，裝錯軀體的靈魂--TG蝶園 跨性別心靈捕手/2004Jul-Dec/transnews_20041026c.htm，2004年10月4日。

LGBT political advocacy groups in Taiwan
2000 establishments in Taiwan
Transgender in Asia
Transgender organizations
Organizations established in 2000